High School Musical: The Musical: The Series: The Soundtrack: Season 2 is the soundtrack album for the second season of the streaming television series High School Musical: The Musical: The Series, which was released coinciding with the second-season finale on July 30, 2021, by Walt Disney Records. The soundtrack for the season contains original songs, as well as songs from the film High School Musical 2 and the stage adaptation of the 1991 film Beauty and the Beast.

Background
In October 2019, High School Musical: The Musical: The Series was renewed for a second season, even before the first season's debut on Disney+ on November 12, 2019. Responding to fan speculation, creator and showrunner Tim Federle denied rumors the second season would revolve around the plot of High School Musical 2; instead, it was revealed in February 2020 the musical would be the stage adaptation of the 1991 film Beauty and the Beast.

Composition 
The soundtrack features new recordings of songs from the film High School Musical 2; "Bet On It" and a medley that includes the songs "Fabulous," "You Are The Music In Me" and "All For One." Also included are new recordings of songs from the stage adaptation of the 1991 film Beauty and the Beast; "Belle," "Beauty and the Beast," "Home," "The Mob Song," "Gaston," "If I Can't Love Her," "Be Our Guest" and "Something There" by Alan Menken, Howard Ashman, and Tim Rice. The soundtrack also features a cover of the Miley Cyrus song "The Climb" by star Joe Serafini.

Recurring star Derek Hough appears as a featured artist on the song "Around You" alongside cast member Kate Reinders. Olivia Rose Keegan, another recurring star, has a solo performance of the song "Home" as the album's closer; and Roman Banks has a solo performance of the song "If I Can't Love Her."

Olivia Rodrigo also wrote a song for the second season, titled "The Rose Song", while Joshua Bassett wrote a song as well, "The Perfect Gift". On writing "The Rose Song", Rodrigo recalled it as "one of her best songs she had ever written" and has a "really intricate metaphor". They also recorded a duet song "Even When/The Best Part" for the series. Bassett revealed that he watched Zac Efron's performance of "Bet On It" from the 2007 film and had sung nearly 30 times with retakes to perform that track.

Singles
Prior to the first episode's premiere, the duet song "Even When/The Best Part" performed by Rodrigo and Bassett was released on April 30, 2021.

In the lead-up to the album's release, each song was released as a single to correlate with the episodes being distributed and all music videos were released individually on the DisneyMusicVEVO YouTube channel as well as the individual artists' channels. "High School Musical 2 Medley", "Something in the Air", "Bet On It" and "The Perfect Gift", were released on the same date as the second season's debut on May 14, 2021. On May 21, 2021, the song "Belle" from the Beauty and the Beast musical, performed by the series cast was released as a single. The same day, the singles "1-2-3" and "YAC Alma Mater" was released. Bassett's solo rendition of "Even When" and Rodrigo's rendition of "The Best Part" were released on May 28 as singles, as was "Red Means Love" and the cover song of "Beauty and the Beast".

On June 4, the music video for "Granted" featuring Rodrigo was released. "A Dancer's Heart" and the cover song of "The Climb" performed by Joe Serafini was released on June 11. "The Rose Song" performed by Rodrigo and the accompanying music video was released on June 18, 2021. On June 25, the singles "Around You" and "The Mob Song" were released. The following week, the singles "Gaston" from the Beauty and the Beast Broadway stage musical, "If I Can't Love Her", were released. On July 9, the songs "You Ain't Seen Nothin'" and "Let You Go" were released. On July 16, the songs "In a Heartbeat" The final singles: "Be Our Guest" and "Something There" were released on July 23.

Release and promotion 
Pre-orders for the soundtrack began on July 21, 2021. The soundtrack was digitally released on July 30, 2021 on all music streaming services, and physically at Target. Walt Disney Records allowed exclusive "storylines" and "canvas" experiences for streamers on Spotify; the "storylines" card featured detailed description about key songs in the soundtrack, while the "canvas" experience, feature videos from the key moments in the second season. The Target exclusive release featured exclusive postcards, a sticker sheet and poster.

Reception 
Popsugar's Kelsie Gibson called the soundtrack as "even more fabulous than the first season". Paste's Alexis Gunderson wrote "the mix of new songs and Beauty and the Beast classics is perfectly struck, too."

Track listing

Charts

See also 
 High School Musical 2 (soundtrack)

References 

High School Musical albums
2021 soundtrack albums
Walt Disney Records soundtracks
Cast recordings
Television soundtracks
High School Musical: The Musical: The Series